Class 378 may refer to:

British Rail Class 378
GWR 378 Class